NEO Japan Ladies Pro-Wrestling (frequently styled as NEO) was a joshi puroresu (women's professional wrestling) promotion established in 1997 by Kyoko Inoue. The first event took place on January 9, 1998.

NEO Japan Ladies Pro-Wrestling
NEO Japan Ladies Pro-Wrestling was founded during All Japan Women's Pro-Wrestling financial struggles. The figurehead of the company was Kyoko Inoue, a former All Japan Women's Pro-Wrestling wrestler.  The name was meant to reference the "Japan Women's Pro-Wrestling" part of the name for All Japan Women's Pro Wrestling. The group was pegged with problems from the beginning as the group was initially supposed to be called New Japan Women's Pro Wrestling, but due to copyright concerns, NEO was chosen instead.

Their first show on January 9, 1998, featured the 9 members of the roster wrestling multiple times due to the small roster. The main event of the first show featured Las Cachorras Orientales of Etsuko Mita and Mima Shimoda teaming with Saya Endo to defeat Chaparita Asari, Kyoko Inoue and Yoshiko Tamura.

During Spring 1998, Kyoko Inoue feuded with Lioness Asuka. Kyoko captured Lioness' TWF title on April 26, 1998. The feud carried over to NEO where they met in a singles match on May 6th, 1998 for  JDStar's TWF Title, in which Asuka won the title back. In August 1998, Nicole Bass toured with the promotion, defeating Etsuko Mita, Chaparita ASARI and Kyoko Inoue on August 16, 1998.

On October 29, 1998, the promotion featured a match between Kyoko Inoue and Aja Kong for Kyoko Inoue's 10th anniversary as a wrestler. 

During Summer 1999, the promotion feuded with  JWP and All Japan Women's Pro-Wrestling, resulting in multiple inter-promotional matches. On July 11, 1999, Kyoko Inoue captured the WWWA World Single Championship of All Japan Women's, defeating Yumiko Hotta. The two had a rematch at a NEO event on October 22, 1999, with Hotta winning the title back.

The original incarnation of the promotion only lasted until January 6, 2000, less than two years after its first show. The last show featured Kyoko Inoue wrestling in every match on the card.

NEO Women's Wrestling
NEO renamed itself to NEO Women's Wrestling after NEO Japan Ladies Pro-Wrestling closed in 2000. The promotion's pre-debut show was on March 16, 2000 and their official debut was on May 31, 2000. The promotion regularly held events at Itabashi Green Hall in Itabashi, Tokyo, due to its smaller size, while running Korakuen Hall for bigger events.

The promotion rose to power in 2005 after the closure of All Japan Women's Pro Wrestling and Gaea Japan, with NEO being considered by many to be the top joshi puroresu promotion during this time. In 2007, founder Kyoko Inoue had complications from her pregnancy and was unable to wrestle, which hurt the promotion.

In 2009, business declined when two of their top stars, Etsuko Mita and idol wrestler Haruka Matsuo retired.

The promotion announced its closure May 5, 2010. Kyoko Inoue announced her resignation, Yoshiko Tamura, Tanny Mouse and Yuki Miyazaki were slated to retire, young wrestlers Aoi Ishibashi and Natsumi Kawano had already left the company and the roster would have only been left with three wrestlers, due to the companies struggles with finding new talent. The company held their final show on December 31, 2010. The first main event featured Ayumi Kurihara capturing her long-awaited first major singles title by defeating Yoshiko Tamura for the NWA Women's Pacific/NEO Single Championship and the second main event featured the remaining members of the NEO roster competing in 10-minute time limit trios match.

Titles

NEO Japan Ladies Pro-Wrestling

International Wrestling Association of Japan

Alumni

 Azumi Hyuga
 Ayako Sato
 Kyoko Inoue
 Kiyoko Ichiki
 Etsuko Mita
 Mima Shimoda
 Yoshiko Tamura
 Chaparita Asari
 Misae Genki
 Haruka Matsuo
 Saya Endo

 Tanny Mouse
 Tomoko Watanabe
 Yuki Miyazaki
 Yuka Shiina
 Nozomi Dai
 Natsumi Kawano
 Mika Iida
 Aya Yuuki
 Nagisa Nozaki
 Nicole Bass

NEO Hall of Fame

Footnotes
 – Entries without a birth name indicates that the inductee did not perform under a ring name.
 – This section mainly lists the major accomplishments of each inductee in the NEO promotion.

References

External links

Japanese women's professional wrestling promotions
Sport in Tokyo